The Parish and Community Meetings (Polls) Rules 1987 (the 1987 Rules) is a British Statutory Instrument (SI) which lays down the rules on polls held as a consequence of parish and community meetings (consequent polls). It was made under powers granted by the Local Government Act 1972 and the Representation of the People Act 1983 and came into force on 16 February 1987. The rules revoked earlier SIs on the subject with the saving that consequent polls demanded before the rules came into were not covered by them. The rules extend to England and Wales.

Rule 4(1) stipulates that the chairman of any meeting where a consequent poll needs to be taken must inform the local district council of the fact that the consequent poll must be taken. That district council is then required to appoint an officer of the council to be returning officer for the consequent poll. Rule 5 stipulates that the Local Elections (Parishes and Communities) Rules 1986 are to be applied to consequent polls with a series of adaptations, alterations and exceptions to those rules so that the consequent poll is conducted in accordance with rules set out in the schedule to the 1987 Rules. Rule 6 then sets out how the Representation of the People Act 1983 is to apply to consequential polls again with a series of adaptations, alterations and exceptions.

Later in 1987 ambiguities were found in the 1987 Rules and the Parish and Community Meetings (Polls) (Amendment) Rules 1987 were made to correct those ambiguities. The Parish and Community Meetings (Polls) (Amendment) Rules 1987 made a series of amendments to the rules in the schedule to the 1987 Rules and also altered the appendix of forms of the schedule. Since then the only amendments were made by the Civil Partnership Act 2004 (Amendments to Subordinate Legislation) Order 2005 which replaced references to husbands and wives in various parts of the 1987 Rules with references to spouses and civil partners.

External links
 Text on OPSI site

1987 in British law
Statutory Instruments of the United Kingdom